Poa cusickii is a species of grass known by the common name Cusick's bluegrass. It is native to western North America from Yukon to Colorado to eastern California, where it grows in many types of habitat, including high mountain meadows and slopes, sagebrush scrub, and forests.

Description
It is a perennial bunchgrass growing dense, sometimes large, clumps up to about 60 centimeters in maximum height. The narrow leaves are firm and sometimes rolled along the edges. The longest leaves are located around the middle of the stem. The inflorescence is a dense, narrow series of overlapping branches bearing up to 100 spikelets in total.

The grass is dioecious, with male and female individuals producing different types of flowers in their inflorescences. The plant often reproduces vegetatively via tillers, or via apomixis with unfertilized seeds, and some populations are made up only of female individuals. One subspecies, ssp. purpurascens, is all female.

References

External links
USDA Plants Profile for Poa cusickii (Cusick's bluegrass)
Grass Manual Treatment of Poa cusickii (Cusick's bluegrass)
Jepson Manual eFlora (TJM2) treatment of Poa cusickii
Jepson eFlora (TJM2): Poa cusickii subsp. cusickii
Jepson eFlora (TJM2): Poa cusickii subsp. epilis
Jepson eFlora (TJM2): Poa cusickii subsp. pallida
Jepson eFlora (TJM2): Poa cusickii subsp. purpurascens

cusickii
Bunchgrasses of North America
Grasses of Canada
Grasses of the United States
Native grasses of California
Flora of Western Canada
Flora of the Western United States
Flora of the Great Basin
Flora of the Sierra Nevada (United States)
Dioecious plants
Flora without expected TNC conservation status